Whores on Crutches is the tenth Bravo stand-up comedy special by stand-up comedian Kathy Griffin and twelfth overall. It was originally called "Diva in a Tipi".

Track listing

Personnel

Technical and production
Andrew Cohen - executive producer
Kathy Griffin - executive producer
Jenn Levy - executive producer
Paul Miller - executive producer
Kimber Rickabaugh - executive producer
David Neal Stewart - Cinematography
Jeff U'ren - film editor
Bruce Ryan - production design
Cisco Henson - executive in charge of production
Kris Sheets - production supervisor
Gene Crowe - associate director, stage manager
Dave Bell - production assistant
Jeremy Katz - production assistant
James Lovewell - production assistant
Tiffany Luard - production assistant

Visuals and imagery
Adam Christopher - makeup artist
Ashlee Mullen - hair stylist
Josh Morton - sound re-recording mixer
Simon Miles - lighting designer
Peter Flaherty - wardrobe

References

External links
Kathy Griffin's Official Website

Kathy Griffin albums
Stand-up comedy albums
2011 live albums